Alaska is a populated place in Jefferson County, Pennsylvania, United States.

See also
Brookville, Pennsylvania

References

Populated places in Jefferson County, Pennsylvania